The following is a list of Government Industrial Training Institutes located in Tamil Nadu, India. All institutes are affiliated with the National Council for Vocational Education and Training.

See also

 List of schools in Tamil Nadu

References

Government Industrial Training Institutes
Industrial Training Institutes
Vocational education in India
Training organisations in India
Industrial Training Institute